Scarborough Open Air Theatre (commonly abbreviated the SOAT or OAT) is an outdoor theatre in Scarborough, North Yorkshire, England. It was built in Northstead Manor Gardens in 1932, and originally closed in 1986 but was reopened in May 2010.

Renovation

In 2008, planning permission was received for a major renovation. The £3.5 million scheme to transform the Open Air Theatre was completed in May 2010.

When it reopened in 2010 the capacity of the theatre was 6,500 but this was increased to 8,000 in 2017 when the lake area was covered over.

Events
The venue stages a mixed entertainment programme including music concerts, opera productions and community events.

During the World Cup 2010, all England football matches were shown live on a large TV screen for free.

In September 2017 music promoters Cuffe & Taylor signed a ten-year deal with the borough council to bring concerts to the venue for the next ten years.

90,000 people attended concerts at the venue in 2018 setting a new audience record for the venue and bringing an estimated £7 million to the local economy.

In December 2018 the venue was used to host the Scarborough Sparkle Christmas event with an ice rink and Christmas market.

Royal re-opening
The theatre was officially opened by the Queen accompanied by the Duke of Edinburgh on 20 May 2010.

References

External links

 

Theatres in Scarborough, North Yorkshire
Outdoor theatres